Siah Siah may refer to various places in Iran:
 Siah Siah, Ilam
 Siah Siah, Gilan-e Gharb, Kermanshah Province
 Siah Siah, Ravansar, Kermanshah Province
 Siah Siah-ye Habib, Kermanshah Province
 Siah Siah-ye Khosravi, Kermanshah Province
 Siah Siah-ye Sheykheh, Kermanshah Province
 Siah Siah-e Dayar, Kermanshah Province

See also
 Sia Sia (disambiguation), various places in Iran